Systropha tropicalis is a species of bee in the genus Systropha, of the family Halictidae.

References
 http://www.atlashymenoptera.net/biblio/Karunaratne_et_al_2006_Sri_Lanka.pdf
 https://www.academia.edu/7390502/AN_UPDATED_CHECKLIST_OF_BEES_OF_SRI_LANKA_WITH_NEW_RECORDS
 http://www.zoologie.umh.ac.be/hymenoptera/biblio/168_Patiny_Michez_2006_Systropha.pdf
 http://animaldiversity.org/accounts/Systropha_tropicalis/classification/
 https://www.itis.gov/servlet/SingleRpt/SingleRpt?search_topic=TSN&search_value=757397

Halictidae
Hymenoptera of Asia
Insects of India
Insects of Sri Lanka
Insects described in 1911